Gachilbong may refer to:

 Gachilbong (Inje County/Yanggu County), a mountain in South Korea
 Gachilbong (Inje County), a mountain in South Korea